Theodore Herbert Tetzlaff (February 5, 1883 – December 8, 1929) was an American racecar driver active in the formative years of auto racing.  He competed in the first four Indianapolis 500s, with a highest finish of second in 1912.  He earned the nickname "Terrible Teddy" due to his rough treatment of his vehicles.  His wide-open throttle racing style would variously win a race, blow up his engine or cause him to crash.  As auto racing strategies evolved from the early "go as fast as you can and see if you can stay on the track," his early dominance of the sport waned.

Biography
Teddy Tetzlaff was born in Orange, California on February 5, 1883.

Speed records

In 1914 the Moross Amusement Company of Ernest Moross engaged Tetzlaff to campaign the  Benz, naming it "Blitzen Benz 2."  He broke the world land speed record mark by running  on the Bonneville Salt Flats.

Motion pictures
Around 1912 Tetzlaff began appearing as himself in several silent motion pictures produced by comedy pioneer Mack Sennett.  He even appeared in one Sennett film The Speed Kings (1913) alongside fellow racing driver Barney Oldfield.  He later became an assistant to actor Wallace Reid on Reid's car racing movies.  His son Ted Tetzlaff was a noted Hollywood cinematographer.

Death
Tetzlaff died in an assisted living facility in Artesia, California on December 8, 1929 as a result of long-term effects of a spinal injury incurred during the 1911 Los Angeles to Phoenix race when his car hit a bump and overturned with Tetzlaff's head striking the ground.  Having recovered quickly, he resumed his racing career and was later engaged in the auto service industry but had to retire as his health deteriorated.

Indianapolis 500 results

Filmography
actor:
1913 The Speed Kings
1919 The Roaring Road
1920 Double Speed
1921 Too Much Speed
1922 Across the Continent
1929 The Fall of Eve

Legacy
Tetzlaff Peak in Utah was named in his honor. The mountain is located near Bonneville Salt Flats where he set the land speed record in 1914.

References

External links
Pictures of Teddy Tetzlaff by James Walter Collinge  1. picture in a Fiat, 3.,4.,9. in a Lozier and last in a Fiat S74.
Photo of Teddy Tetzlaff at devianart
Photo of Teddy Tetzlaff at oldracingcars

1883 births
1929 deaths
Sportspeople from Orange, California
Racing drivers from Los Angeles
Indianapolis 500 drivers
AAA Championship Car drivers